Claire Alys Pfister (born January 11, 1995), known professionally as Claire Julien, is a former American actress. She is known for her role as Chloe Tainer in Sofia Coppola's crime film The Bling Ring (2013).

Julien was born in Los Angeles, California, the daughter of Anna Julien and Academy Award-winning cinematographer Wally Pfister. Before landing the role of Chloe in The Bling Ring, Julien's only film credit was a minor part in The Dark Knight Rises (2012), for which her father was the director of photography.

Julien attended the Fashion Institute of Design & Merchandising (FIDM), from which she graduated in 2016.

Filmography

References

External links
 

1995 births
21st-century American actresses
Actresses from Los Angeles
American film actresses
Living people